Sphex lucae is a species of thread-waisted wasp in the family Sphecidae.

References

Sphecidae
Articles created by Qbugbot
Insects described in 1867